William Grill is an illustrator, whose first children's book, Shackleton's Journey, depicting Ernest Shackleton's Imperial Trans-Antarctic Expedition, won the Kate Greenaway Medal in 2015. Grill graduated from University College Falmouth, is dyslexic, and runs a weekly art club at a local school.

His second book is titled The Wolves of Currumpaw, and is based on the story "Lobo the King of Currumpaw", (from Wild Animals I Have Known) by naturalist Ernest Thompson Seton.

Awards
 2015 Winner – Kate Greenaway Medal for Shackleton's Journey
 2015 Winner – School Library Association Information Book Award for Shackleton's Journey

References

External links
 

British children's book illustrators
British children's writers
Living people
Date of birth missing (living people)
British people with disabilities
People with dyslexia
1977 births